Camilla Margareta Richardsson (born 14 September 1993) is a Finnish middle-distance runner. She competed at the 2015 World Championships in Athletics in Beijing, 2017 in London and 2019 in Doha without qualifying for the final. Her personal best in the event is 9:35.27 set in Joensuu in 2019. Richardsson is a Swedish-speaking Finn.

Competition record

References

External links
 

1993 births
Living people
Finnish female middle-distance runners
Finnish female steeplechase runners
World Athletics Championships athletes for Finland
People from Vaasa
Swedish-speaking Finns